Mount Uluiqalau 
Mount Uluiqalau is the highest mountain on the island of Taveuni in Fiji. It is 1,241 meters or 4,072 feet high and also the second highest mountain in the Fiji group.

References

External links 
 Peakbagger.com

Uluigalau
Taveuni